Jeffrey John Lloyd (born March 14, 1954) is a former American football player.  He played college football at West Texas A&M and played in the National Football League primarily as a defensive end for the Buffalo Bills and the Kansas City Chiefs.

Lloyd played as an offensive lineman in college and was selected to play in the Senior Bowl after the 1975 season.

Lloyd was drafted by the Seattle Seahawks with the 62 pick in the 3rd round of the 1976 NFL Draft.  The Seahawks waived him before the 1976 season.  He then signed with the Bills before the season started, and played in 9 games for the Bills in 1976.  The Chiefs signed him after the 1977 season.  He played in all 16 regular season games for the Chiefs in 1978, starting 4 and recovering one fumble.

References

1954 births
Living people
Buffalo Bills players
Kansas City Chiefs players
West Texas A&M Buffaloes football players
Players of American football from Pennsylvania
People from St. Marys, Pennsylvania